Group A of the 1992 Federation Cup Asia/Oceania Zone was one of two pools in the Asia/Oceania zone of the 1992 Federation Cup. Four teams competed in a round robin competition, with the top two teams advancing to the knockout stage.

South Korea vs. Philippines

India vs. Malaysia

South Korea vs. Malaysia

Philippines vs. India

South Korea vs. India

Philippines vs. Malaysia

See also
Fed Cup structure

References

External links
 Fed Cup website

1992 Federation Cup Asia/Oceania Zone